There are at least 24 named lakes and reservoirs in Crawford County, Arkansas.

Lakes
 Hollis Lake, el.  
 Ned Lake, el.  
 Switchback Lake, el.  
 Wildcat Lake, el.

Reservoirs
 Beverly Hills Lake, el.  
 Brandenburg Lake, el.  
 Cold Spring Lake, el.  
 Hall Lake, el.  
 Hammond Lake, el.  
 Johnson Lake, el.  
 Lake Alma, el.  
 Lake Fort Smith, el.  
 Lake Shepherd Springs, el.  
 Lake Sheppard Spring Reservoir, el.  
 Lee Creek Reservoir, el.  
 Louemma Lake, el.  
 Montgomery Lake, el.  
 Morris Lake, el.  
 Mount Gaylor Lake, el.  
 Ozark Lake, el.  
 Pine Mountain Lake, el.  
 Swearinger Lake, el.  
 T J House Reservoir, el.  
 Van Buren Water Reservoir, el.

See also

 List of lakes in Arkansas

Notes

Bodies of water of Crawford County, Arkansas
Crawford